The Serial Line Internet Protocol (SLIP) is an encapsulation of the Internet Protocol designed to work over serial ports and router connections. On personal computers, SLIP has largely been replaced by the Point-to-Point Protocol (PPP), which is better engineered, has more features, and does not require its IP address configuration to be set before it is established. On microcontrollers, however, SLIP is still the preferred way of encapsulating IP packets, due to its very small overhead.

Some people refer to the successful and widely used  Serial Line Internet Protocol as "Rick Adams' SLIP", to avoid confusion with other proposed protocols named "SLIP". Those other protocols include the much more complicated  appendix D Serial Line Interface Protocol.

Description

SLIP modifies a standard TCP/IP datagram by:

 appending a special "END" byte to it, which distinguishes datagram boundaries in the byte stream,
 if the END byte occurs in the data to be sent, the two byte sequence ESC, ESC_END is sent instead,
 if the ESC byte occurs in the data, the two byte sequence ESC, ESC_ESC is sent.
 variants of the protocol may begin, as well as end, packets with END.

SLIP requires a serial port configuration of 8 data bits, no parity, and either EIA hardware flow control, or CLOCAL mode (3-wire null-modem) UART operation settings.

SLIP does not provide error detection, being reliant on upper layer protocols for this. Therefore, SLIP on its own is not satisfactory over an error-prone dial-up connection. It is however still useful for testing operating systems' response capabilities under load (by looking at flood-ping statistics).

SLIP escape characters were also required on some modem connections to escape Hayes command set, allowing therefore to pass binary data through those modems that would recognize some characters as commands.

CSLIP
A version of SLIP with header compression is called Compressed SLIP (CSLIP). The compression algorithm used in CSLIP is known as Van Jacobson TCP/IP Header Compression. CSLIP has no effect on the data payload of a packet and is independent of any compression by the serial line modem used for transmission. It reduces the Transmission Control Protocol (TCP) header from twenty bytes to seven bytes. CSLIP has no effect on User Datagram Protocol (UDP) datagrams.

See also
 Parallel Line Internet Protocol
 Slirp
 KA9Q
 Direct cable connection
 In-band signaling
 KISS (TNC)
Consistent Overhead Byte Stuffing

References

External links

 RFC1055: 
 RFC1144:  — introduced the Van Jacobson TCP/IP Header Compression used by CSLIP

Internet protocols
Link protocols
Logical link control